Beyond the Curtain is a 1960 British drama film written and directed by Compton Bennett, and starring Richard Greene and Eva Bartok.

Plot
A refugee from East Germany finds herself trapped in her home city of Dresden when a plane she is travelling on between Berlin and West Germany is forced down. She is used by the Stasi, who want her to help them to find her dissident brother.

Cast
 Richard Greene as Captain Jim Kyle  
 Eva Bartok as Karin von Seefeldt  
 Marius Goring as Hans Körtner  
 Lucie Mannheim as Frau von Seefeldt  
 Andree Melly as Linda  
 George Mikell as Pieter von Seefeldt  
 John Welsh as Turner  
 Denis Shaw as Krumm  
 Annette Carell as Governor  
 Gaylord Cavallaro as Twining  
 Leonard Sachs as Waiter  
 Brian Wilde as Bill Seddon  
 Steve Plytas as Zimmerman  
 Guy Kingsley Poynter as Captain Law
 André Mikhelson as Russian Colonel

External links

1960 films
1960 drama films
British aviation films
British drama films
1960s English-language films
Films directed by Compton Bennett
Cold War films
Films critical of communism
Films about the Berlin Wall
Films set in East Germany
1960s British films